Eye'm All Mixed Up is the fourth remix album by the Christian pop singer and rapper tobyMac. It consists of ten songs from Eye on It remixed by artists such as Capital Kings, Soul Glow Activatur, and Telemitry. It was released on November 4, 2014.

Track listing

Note
Tracks 4, 5, 7 & 11 originally on the deluxe edition of Eye on It.

Charts

References 

TobyMac albums
2014 remix albums
ForeFront Records albums
Christian electronic dance music albums